Yemelyan Danilov (1627–1654) was a Russian bellmaker.

Yemelyan Danilov was born to a famous family of Muscovite bellmakers, the progenitor of which was Danila Matveyev. The latter was an apprentice to Kirill Samoylov, who, in turn, had once been a student of Andrey Chokhov. Danila Matveyev cast his first bells in 1622 and would receive an honorary title of "tsar's bellmaker" (государев колокольных дел мастер). The information about Danila Matveyev's career is rather scarce. It is known that he and his son Yemelyan Danilov cast a 700-pood (11,500 kg) bell for the Ipatiev Monastery in Kostroma in 1647. In 1651, Danila and Yemelyan began preparations for the recasting of the 800-pood (13,100 kg) Resurrection Bell (Воскресный колокол) for the Assumption belltower of the Moscow Kremlin. Danila could not finish this assignment due to his death that same year.

After the tsar had chosen him over a German bellmaker Hans Falk, Yemelyan Danilov continued his father's work and finished casting the Resurrection Bell in 1652. The bell weighed 998 poods (16,350 kg) and was used until 1782, when it would be recast by Yakov Zavyalov into a new 1017-pood (16,660 kg) bell. This new bell rang until the early 20th century and then cracked. In the 1930s, it was taken down by the Soviets and melted.

In 1652, tsar Alexei Mikhailovich ordered Yemelyan Danilov to cast a new 8,000-pood (130 tonne) bell instead of the broken Big Assumption Bell made by Andrey Chokhov. Danilov cast the bell in 1654, but it would be cracked in less than a year during festivities when it was still being refined. However, Yemelyan Danilov didn't live to see this day. He died during the outbreak of bubonic plague in Moscow in the summer of 1654.

Only two bells by Yemelyan Danilov survived to this day. One of them is a beautiful 60-pood (980 kg) bell (now in the Kolomenskoye museum), cast in 1648. The second 80-pood (1,300 kg) bell called Баран (Ram) (cast in 1654) still hangs on a famous belltower of the Rostov kremlin.

Yemelyan Danilov is also known to have been a protégé of a young bellmaker Alexander Grigoriev, who would be accepted to the Cannon Yard on his guarantee.

1627 births
1654 deaths
Russian bell makers